The Postmaster-General of Victoria was a position in the government of the colony Victoria (Australia) prior to the Federation of Australia in 1901. The position was created soon after Victoria became a separate colony in 1851 (see History of Victoria).

List of Postmasters-General of Victoria

From 1901 the duties were taken over by the Commonwealth of Australia.

References

Lists of British, Australian and New Zealand Surveyors-General, Government Geologists... Retrieved 5 September 2016
Australian Dictionary of Biography - Postmaster-general

1857 establishments in Australia
1901 disestablishments in Australia